Southport Historic District may refer to:

Southport Historic District (Fairfield, Connecticut), listed on the NRHP in Connecticut
Southport Historic District (Southport, North Carolina), listed on the NRHP in North Carolina